

Watchmakers
This list is a duplicate of :Category:Watchmakers, which will likely be more up-to-date and complete. Manufacturers that are named after the founder are sorted by surname. Names in this list require an article about the watch brand or watchmaker.

0–9 
 88 Rue du Rhone

A 
 A. Lange & Söhne
 Accurist
 Adidas
 ADINA Watches
 Adriatica
 A.L.B Atelier Le Brézéguet
 Alba
 American Waltham Watch Company
 Anonimo (watch)
 Ansonia
 Apple Inc.
 Aquastar
 Aragon
 Armand Nicolet
 Armani Exchange
 Armitron
 John Arnold
 ASUAG
 Audemars Piguet
 Ateliers deMonaco

B 
 Backes & Strauss 
 B-UHR
 Bausele
 Ball Watch Company
 Webb C. Ball
 Balmain
 Barrington Griffiths Watch Company
 Baume et Mercier
 Bedat & Co
 Beijing Watch Factory
 Bell & Ross
 Benetton Group
 Benrus
 Beverly Hills Polo Club
 Binda Group
 Blancpain
 Blumarine
 Ernest Borel
 Boccia
 BOLDR Supply Co
 Bomberg
 Jochen Benzinger
 Bovet Fleurier
 Édouard Bovet
 Bozeman Watch Company
 Abraham-Louis Breguet
 Breguet
 Breil
 Breitling
 Bremont Watch Company
 Gustav Bruemmer
 Buccellati
 Bulgari
 Bulova
 Burberry

C 
 Calvin Klein
 Candino
 Carl F. Bucherer
 Cartier SA
 Casio
 Catorex
 Cecil Purnell
 Century Time Gems Ltd
 Certina
 Cerutti
 Chanel
 Charles Jourdan
 Charriol
 Chaumet
 Konstantin Chaykin
 Chopard
 Christian Jacques
 Christopher Ward
 Chronostar
 Chronoswiss
 Chronotech
 Chung Nam
 Citizen
 Claude Bernard
 Clyda
 Concord watch
 Corum
 Condor
 Curtis Australia
 Cyma Watches
 Czapek & Cie

D 
 D1 Milano
 Dakota
 Damasko
 Damiani
 Dan Henry Watches
 Daniel Wellington
 George Daniels
 Danish Designs
 Daywatch
 Aaron Lufkin Dennison
 Edward John Dent
 Diesel
 Dior
 DKNY
 Dolce & Gabbana
 D. Dornblüth & Sohn
 Doxa S.A.
 Dreffa
 Dubey Schaldenbrand
 Roger Dubuis
 Dueber-Hampden

E 
 Thomas Earnshaw
 Ebel
 Eberhard & Co.
 Edox
 Etienne Aigner
 Elgin National Watch Company
 Elle
 Elysee
 Emporio Armani
 Epos
 Endura
 Louis Erard
 ETA SA
 Esprit
 Eterna
 Everswiss

F 
 F. P. Journe
 Fastrack
 A. Favre & Fils
 Carlo Ferrara
 Festina
 Favre-Leuba
 Fendi
 Ferragamo
 Fila
 Fortis Uhren
 Frédérique Constant
 Fossil, Inc.
 Folli Follie
 Charles Frodsham
 French Connection
 Fitbit
 Franck Muller

G 
 Gallet & Co.
 Gant
 Garmin
 Léon Gallet
 Romain Gauthier
 General Watch Co
 Geneve
 Louis George
 Giordano
 Girard-Perregaux
 Glashütte Original
 Glycine Watch SA
 George Graham
 Greubel Forsey
 Moritz Grossmann
 Grovana Watch
 Gruen Watch Co.
 Gucci
 Guess
 Guy Laroche

H 
 Hagley West
 Halda Watch Company
 Vianney Halter
 Hamilton Watch Company
 Hangzhou Watch Company
 Hanhart
 Hanowa
 John Harrison
 Hermès
 HMT Limited
 E. Howard & Co. 
 Huawei 
 Hublot
 Hugo Boss

I 
 Ikepod
 Illinois Watch Company
 Ingersoll Watch Company
 International Watch Company
 Invicta Watch Group

J  
 J.Springs
 Jacques du Manoir
 Jacques Lemans
 Jaguar
 Jaeger-LeCoultre
 Pierre Jaquet-Droz
 Georg Jensen
 Jacob & Co
 Jean Perret
 F.P. Journe
 Jowissa
 Junghans
 Jules Jurgensen
 Jorg Gray
 Jaipur Watch Company

K 
 Karl Lagerfeld
 Kenneth Cole
 Kenzo
 Kerbholz
 Kienzle
 Kudoke
 Kurono Tokyo
 Kikuchi Nakagawa
 Kosmo

L 
 Lacoste
 Laco Uhrenmanufaktur
 Lancashire Watch Company
 Lang & Heyne
 A. Lange & Söhne
 Jean Lassale
 Lee Cooper
 Leijona watch
 Lemania
 Levi Strauss & Co.
 Léon Hatot
 Lilienthal Berlin
 Limit
 Linde Werdelin
 Lip
 Peter Litherland
 Locman
 Longines
 Lorus
 Lotus
 Louis Erard
 Louis Moinet
 Louis Vuitton
 Luch
 Luminox

M
 Maitres du Temps
 Manhattan Watch Company
 Manistee Watch
 Manufacture royale
 Marc Ecko
 Marc Jacobs
 Maserati
 Mathey-Tissot
 Maurice Lacroix
 Mazzucato
 MB&F
 MeisterSinger
 Melbourne Watch Company
 Michael Kors
 Mido
 Ming
 Miss Sixty
 Molnija
 Montblanc
 Morgan
 Mondaine
 Louis Moinet
 Montblanc
 Montegrappa
 Morellato Group
 Moschino
 H. Moser & Cie
 Mossimo
 Movado
 Franck Muller

N 
 Nautica
 Newgate Watches
 Nivada
 Nixon Watches
 Nomos Glashütte
 Norqain
 Nostal
 Nike Inc.
 Nordgreen

O 
 Oakley Watches
 Olivia Burton
 Ollech & Wajs
 Omega
 Orex
 Orient
 Oris
 O bag

P 
 Paco Rabanne
 Panerai
 Parmigiani Fleurier
 Parnis Watches
 Antoni Patek
 Patek Philippe
 Paul Hewitt
 Perrelet
 Pequignet
 Petrodvorets Watch Factory
 Philip Zepter
 Piaget SA
 Pierre Cardin
 Adrien Philippe
 Henry Pitkin
 Pobeda (Victory)
 Polar
 Police
 Poljot
 Polo Ralph Lauren
 Prada
 Pulsar
 Polic
 PRIM
 Purnell (company)

Q 
 Q&Q
 Quantum

R 
 Ritzy Group
 Rado
 Raketa (Rocket)
 David Ramsay
 Razer Inc. 
 Raymond Weil 
 Rebecca Minkoff
 Regata
 Regina
 Reguladora
 Ressence
 Revue Thommen
 Richard Mille
 Richelieu
 Roamer
 Roberto Cavalli
 Rodania
 Rolex
 Romago
 Ronda AG
 Rostam
 Rosefield
 Rotary Watches
 Daniel Roth

S 
 Samsung Galaxy Watch
 Sandoz watches
 Schwarz Etienne
 Sea-Gull
 Sector
 Seiko
 Seiko Epson
 Seiko Instruments
 Seikosha
 Sekonda
 Sheen
 Shinola Detroit
 Shanghai Watch Co.
 Shoreham Watches
 Sinn
 SSIH (previous holding company, now integrated into Swatch Group)
 Skagen Designs
 Skechers
 Alexander Shorokhoff
 Slazenger
 Slava watches
 Slow watch
 Roger W. Smith
 SMH (short for Société de Microélectronique et d'Horlogerie previous name of the company issued from the merger of ASUAG & SSIH, now Swatch Group)
 Bruno Söhnle

 Solvil et Titus
 Speake-Marin 
 Squale
 Star Watch Case Company
 Stauer
 Steinhart
 Stepan Sarpaneva
 Stirling
 Stowa
 Andreas Strehler
 Stührling
 Superdry
 Suunto
 Stuniii
 Swarovski
 Swatch Group
 Swiss Military

T 
 TAG Heuer
 Technos
 Ted Lapidus
 Thierry Mugler
 Seth Thomas
 Thoma
 Thomas Sabo
 Thomas Tompion
 Tianjin Sea-Gull
 Tiffany & Co
 Timberland
 Timex Group
 Tissot
 Titan Industries
 Tommy Hilfiger
 Tourneau
 ToyWatch
 Tudor
 Tutima
 TW Steel
 Titoni

U 
 U-Boat
 Ulysse Nardin
 Union Glashutte
 Universal Genève
 Urwerk

V 
 Vacheron Constantin
 Vacuum Chronometer Corporation
 Valentino
 Valjoux
 Versace
 Victorinox
 Visconti
 Vostok watches

W 
 Waltham International SA
 Waltham Watch Company
 Christopher Ward
 Wenger
 Westclox
 WeWOOD
 West End Watch Co
 Wittnauer
 Joseph Windmills
 Harry Winston

X
 Xezo

Y 
 Yema (watch)

Z 
 Zenith
 Zeno-Watch Basel
 Zeppelin
 Zetner
 Zodiac Watches
 Zero West

See also 

List of German watch manufacturers
List of clock manufacturers

References

Watches
 Watchmakers
Watch manufacturing companies
Watch